Daniel Payne (born 27 October 1978) is an Australian cricketer. He played in ten first-class and nine List A matches for Queensland between 2001 and 2003.

See also
 List of Queensland first-class cricketers

References

External links
 

1978 births
Living people
Australian cricketers
Queensland cricketers
Cricketers from Brisbane